All Tied Up is a 1994 movie.

All Tied Up may also refer to:

"All Tied Up" (song), by Ronnie McDowell
"All Tied Up", a song by Robin Thicke from Love After War